Four Seasons of Love is the fourth studio album by American singer-songwriter Donna Summer. Released on October 11, 1976, this  concept album became her third consecutive successful album to be certified gold in the US. It peaked at #29 on the Billboard 200. In addition, all the cuts on this album went to number one on the disco chart.

This was the third concept album Summer had made, though unlike the previous two which had contained one long track on side one and a small selection of slightly shorter ones on side two, Four Seasons of Love was more equally balanced. The album told the story of a love affair by relating it to the four seasons. Side one contained "Spring Affair" and "Summer Fever", both disco tracks, and side two contained "Autumn Changes" (a slightly slower disco number) and "Winter Melody" (which had an even slower beat), plus a reprise of "Spring Affair". This concept was reflected in the four photos of Summer, one for each season of the year, in a pull-out 1977 calendar included with the original LP album.  The photo on the cover was, fittingly, the Summer pic. Summer's "first lady of love" image came across strongly on this album, though her trademark moans and groans were slightly less evident than on previous work. Pics included "Winter" in a fur with a tear on her cheek; "Spring" in a Scarlett O'Hara style hoop skirt on a swing; and "Autumn" re-enacting Marilyn Monroe's famous scene from The Seven Year Itch with the billowing white dress over the subway grate. This is an allusion to her song "Love to Love You Baby", for which she cites Monroe as an inspiration.

As with the previous two albums, Four Seasons of Love was distributed by different record labels in different countries, including Casablanca Records in the U.S. Edited versions of "Spring Affair" and "Winter Melody" were released in various places, but neither had a big impact on any charts (although the latter made the Top 30 on the UK singles chart). The album was also released as a Club Special Edition / Club Sonderauflage in West Germany on the Atlantic Records Label.

Track listing

Personnel 
 Donna Summer – lead vocals
 Thor Baldursson – keyboards, string and horn arrangements
 Keith Forsey – drums, percussion
 Nick Woodland – guitar
 Les Hurdle – bass guitar
 Dino Solera – saxophone
 Geoff Bastow – synthesizer
 Madeline Bell, Sue & Sunny – backing vocals
Technical
 Mixed by Giorgio Moroder
 Engineered by Jürgen Koppers
 Album Cover Concept by Susan Munao, Joyce Bogart & Donna Summer
 Design by Henry Vizcarra & Gribbitt!
 Art Direction by Gribbitt! & Chris Whorf
 Photography – Mario Casilli

Charts

Weekly charts

Year-end charts

Certifications and sales

References

1976 albums
Donna Summer albums
Albums produced by Giorgio Moroder
Albums produced by Pete Bellotte
Casablanca Records albums
Concept albums